Joe Regent (1878-1945) was an Australian rugby league footballer who played in the 1900s.  He played for Balmain and was a foundation player of the club.

Background
Regent was born in Rozelle, New South Wales and was the son of French immigrants.  Regent played Rugby Union with Balmain RFC before switching codes to join Balmain.

Playing career
Regent made his first grade debut for Balmain against Western Suburbs on 20 April 1908 at Birchgrove Oval, which was the club's first ever game and also the opening week of the inaugural NSWRL competition.  Balmain went on to win the match 24-0 in front of 3000 spectators with Regent playing at Fullback.

Regent played with Balmain up until the end of the 1909 before retiring.  Regent played representative football for New South Wales in 1909 appearing in 2 games.

References

1878 births
1945 deaths
Australian rugby league players
Balmain Tigers players
New South Wales rugby league team players
Rugby league players from Sydney
Rugby league second-rows
Rugby league props
Rugby league hookers
Rugby league fullbacks